Lyle Ellsworth Douglass (March 10, 1888 in Chicago, Illinois – December 23, 1943) was a member of the Wisconsin State Assembly.

Biography
Douglass was born in March 1888. He graduated from what is now known as Carroll University and served in the United States Army during World War I.

Political career
Douglass was a member of the Assembly during the 1935, 1937 and 1939 sessions. He was a Republican.

References

External links
Mocavo
Wisconsin Historical Society

Republican Party members of the Wisconsin State Assembly
Military personnel from Wisconsin
United States Army personnel of World War I
Carroll University alumni
1888 births
1943 deaths
20th-century American politicians